This article records new taxa of plants that are scheduled to be described during the year 2017, as well as other significant discoveries and events related to paleobotany that are scheduled to occur in the year 2017.

Ferns and fern allies

Liverworts

Lycophytes

Ginkgoales

Cycads

Conifers

Other seed plants

Other plants

Flowering plants

General research
 Bomfleur et al. (2017) also provide an evolutionary (phylogenetic, non-cladistic) classification in line with PPG I for all rhizome fossils of king ferns (Osmundales), which recognizes and describes two families with two subfamilies each (3 extinct, 1 extant), 13 extinct and six extant genera from the late Permian to now; the study includes as well an introduction into rhizome anatomy, a glossary of terminology, an analysis template (walkthrough) for placing new fossils, and a polytomous key to extinct and extant taxa.
A specimen of the extant moss species Helicophyllum torquatum is described from the Miocene Dominican amber by Kubilius et al. (2017).
 A study on a deep, repetitive impression within a Devonian sandstone block recovered in a gravel quarry near Griffith (New South Wales, Australia) is published by McLean (2017), who considers the impression to be likely formed by the trunk or shed periderm of a large lycopsid.
 A study on the phylogenetic relationships of fossil seed plants based on data recovered from the fossil cuticles is published by Vajda et al. (2017).
 New fossils of the early seed plant Cosmosperma polyloba, providing new information making it possible to reconstruct the entire plant, are described from the Devonian (Famennian) Wutong Formation (China) by Liu et al. (2017).
 Description of fossil leaves of Plagiozamites oblongifolius from the upper Permian of southwest China (with well-preserved cuticles showing a combination of features typical for cycadaleans) is published by Feng et al. (2017).
 A study on the impact of a global warming event across the Triassic–Jurassic boundary on the ecological functioning of gymnosperm communities from East Greenland as indicated by the value of leaf mass per area is published by Soh et al. (2017).
 A diverse assemblage of petrified woods is described from the latest Cretaceous–earliest Paleocene of Deccan Intertrappean Beds (India) by Wheeler et al. (2017), who note the presence of anatomical features of the studied specimens that make the Deccan assemblage more similar to the recent Indian and other Paleotropical woods from Asia and Africa than with the latest Cretaceous and Paleocene woods from the rest of the world.
 A study on the diversity of insect herbivory on fossil angiosperm leaves from the Miocene Hindon Maar fossil lagerstätte (Otago, New Zealand) is published by Möller et al. (2017).
 Volatile organic compounds produced by members of the family Dipterocarpaceae are described from the Miocene amber from northeastern India by Dutta et al. (2017).
 A leaf fragment of a member of the fern family Lindsaeaceae of uncertain phylogenetic placement is described from the Cretaceous Burmese amber by Regalado et al. (2017).
 Several permineralised axes of the conifer wood Ningxiaites specialis with preserved beetle borings and beetle remains are described from the Permian (Changhsingian) Sunjiagou Formation (China) by Feng et al. (2017).
 A study on the tree rings in the early Permian gymnosperm wood from the Chemnitz petrified forest (Germany) is published by Luthardt & Rößler (2017), who interpret the findings as indicating the occurrence of the 11-year solar cycle.
 Conifer fossils preserving evidence of serotiny, interpreted as a fire-adaptive trait, are described from the Cretaceous (Cenomanian) Tupuangi Formation (Pitt Island, New Zealand) by Mays, Cantrill & Bevitt (2017).
 A leafy axis of the conifer Glenrosa carentonensis is described from the Cretaceous amber from France by Moreau et al. (2017).
 Fossil specimens of the golden larch preserving cuticles are described from the late Miocene Shengxian Formation (China) by Bai & Li (2017).
 A study on the stem and leaf anatomy of members of the families Cheirolepidiaceae (a member of the genus Pseudofrenelopsis of uncertain specific assignment) and Araucariaceae (Brachyphyllum obesum) known from the Lower Cretaceous (Aptian) Crato Formation (Brazil) is published by Batista et al. (2017).
 Peris et al. (2017) describe gymnosperm pollen preserved with a specimen of the false blister beetle species Darwinylus marcosi from the Cretaceous amber from Spain, and interpret the finding as indicating that false blister beetles originally were pollinators of gymnosperms (most likely cycads) before transitioning onto angiosperm hosts.
 A review of the fossil record and early evolution of five groups of brachyceran flies, discussing their probable ecological associations with early flowering plants, is published by Zhang & Wang (2017).
 Fossil pollen grains of members of the family Loranthaceae, preserving morphological features making it possible to assign the pollen to distinct lineages within the Loranthaceae, are described from the middle Eocene of the United States, Greenland, Central Europe and East Asia, and from the late Oligocene/early Miocene of Germany by Grímsson et al. (2017).
 Plant remains found in the Late Cretaceous (Maastrichtian) Lameta sediments and associated sauropod coprolites from the Nand-Dongargaon basin (Maharashtra, India) are described by Sonkusare, Samant & Mohabey (2017).
 A study on the impact of large herbivorous dinosaurs on global nutrient availability in the Cretaceous as indicated by remnant plant material (coal deposits) is published by Doughty (2017).
 A study on the molecular age of the earliest flowering plant lineages is published by Salomo et al. (2017), who recover the flowering plants as originating at the late Permian, ~275 million years ago.

References

2017 in paleontology
Paleobotany
2017 in science